William Cottier Crebbin (8 March 1869 – 9 December 1924) was an Australian rules footballer who played with Essendon in the Victorian Football League (VFL).		
		
In 2018 an Australian rules football card featuring Essendon player Bill Crebbin published by the American Tobacco Company in 1894 sold for $10,110 on EBay in Australia.

Notes

External links 
		

1869 births
1924 deaths
Australian rules footballers from Victoria (Australia)
Essendon Football Club players